Anubhav is a 1971 Hindi-language film by noted director Basu Bhattacharya, which stars Sanjeev Kumar, Tanuja and Dinesh Thakur. The film was the first part of Basu Battacharya's introspective trilogy on marital discord in an urban setting, which included Avishkaar (1973) and Griha Pravesh (1979); and went on to win the 1972 National Film Award for Second Best Feature Film and started a trend later picked up even by the mainstream cinema. The film is also remembered for playback singer Geeta Dutt's finest songs composed by music director Kanu Roy with lyrics from Gulzar, like Meri Jaan Mujhe Jaan Na Kaho, Koi Chupke Se Aake and Mera Dil Jo Mera Hota

Plot
Meeta Sen (Tanuja) and Amar Sen (Sanjeev Kumar) have been married for several years. Due to Amar's hectic work schedule, the couple did not have children, as there was no time for intimacy. Meeta decides to take matters into her own hands, gets rid of the servants, save for Hari (A. K. Hangal), and decides to run the household on her own. This gets the couple to be closer, and eventually they do get intimate. And then Meeta's old flame Shashi Bhushan (Dinesh Thakur) not only re-enters Meeta's life, but also gets employed in the same organization as Amar, throwing their marriage again in jeopardy. One day while at home, Amar and Shashi discuss their work and Amar says that he'll join the office from tomorrow because he's recovered now from his flu. While Shashi leaves, Amar sees him talking with his wife. The next day, he asks Meeta to call for Shashi in an intimidating and arrogant tone, after Shashi leaves, Amar confronts Meeta and she explains their past relationship to him. Amar leaves the house without saying anything and asks Shashi to resign, though Shashi already has written his resignation letter because he sees himself as a reason of upheaval in their lives. Knowing this, Amar says that "the past comes between us only when we aren't able to live the present completely". After reaching home, Amar tries to tell Meeta, but she circumlocutes in an amusing manner and says that she has understood and tells him that she has understood that he has understood. The movie ends with them embracing each other.

Cast
Sanjeev - Amar Sen
Tanuja - Meeta Sen
Dinesh - Shashi Bhushan
A. K. Hangal - Hari
Paresh Nanda
O. P. Kohli - Dr. Kohli
Subir Sen - Himself
Rainer F. Brusten - Moshe Andre (Guest Appearance)
Dhumketu - (Guest Appearance)
Lalit - (Guest Appearance)
Atul - (Guest Appearance)
N. K. Mukherjee - (Guest Appearance)
Kinkar Sinha - (Guest Appearance)
Meena Sinha - (Guest Appearance)
Subhash Chowdhari - (Guest Appearance)

Crew
Director - Basu Bhattacharya
Screenplay - Basu Bhattacharya
Dialogues - Kapil Kumar, Sagar Sarhadi
Producer - Basu Bhattacharya
Editor - S. Chakravarty, Sakharam Borse (assistant)
Cinematographer - Nando Bhattacharya
Art Decor - Rinki Bhattacharya, Atul (assistant)
Production Manager - M. Venugopal
Assistant Director - Manik Chatterjee, Dhanlal, Lalit Rai
Assistant Cameraman - Randev Bhaduri, Dhondu, Vijay Hangal (stills)
Costumes - Efem
Music Director - Kanu Roy
Lyricist - Gulzar
Playback Singers - Manna Dey, Geeta Dutt, Subir Sen

Soundtrack
The film is remembered for its memorable songs sung by Geeta Dutt, Manna Dey and Subir Sen as guest appearance with music by Kanu Roy and evocative lyrics by Gulzar, while one song Koi Chupke Se Aake was written by Kapil Kumar, who also co-wrote film's dialogues.

Awards and nominations
1972 National Film Award for Second Best Feature Film

References

External links
 

1971 films
Indian black-and-white films
1970s Hindi-language films
Films whose cinematographer won the Best Cinematography National Film Award
Films scored by Kanu Roy
Second Best Feature Film National Film Award winners